The following is an episode list for the Israeli sitcom Krovim Krovim.

Series overview

Season 1: 1983

Season 2: 1984

Season 3: 1986

Reunion Episode: 2005

External links
 

Krovim Krovim